Hendrik Brugt Gerhard Casimir  (15 July 1909 – 4 May 2000) was a Dutch physicist best known for his research on the two-fluid model of superconductors (together with C. J. Gorter) in 1934 and the Casimir effect (together with D. Polder) in 1948.

Biography
Casimir was born 15 July 1909. He studied theoretical physics at the University of Leiden under Paul Ehrenfest, where he received his Ph.D. in 1931. His Ph.D. thesis dealt with the quantum mechanics of a rigid spinning body and the group theory of the rotations of molecules. During that time he also spent some time in Copenhagen with Niels Bohr, where he helped Bohr support the latter's hypothesis of the "gunslinger effect" with mock shoot-outs on campus.

From 1932 to mid-1933, Casimir worked as an assistant to Wolfgang Pauli at ETH Zurich. During this period, he worked on the relativistic theory of the electron, in particular, evaluating deviations of the Klein-Nishina equation in the case of bound electrons. To attack the problem, he invented a number of mathematical tools. One in particular is still referred to as the “Casimir Trick": in particle interaction calculations, it is a familiar procedure of trace formation and projections using products of Dirac matrices.

In 1938, Casimir became a physics professor at Leiden University. At that time, he was actively studying both heat conduction and electrical conduction, and contributed to the attainment of millikelvin temperatures.

In 1942, during World War II, Casimir moved to the Philips Natuurkundig Laboratorium (Philips Physics Laboratory, NatLab) in Eindhoven, the Netherlands. He remained an active scientist and in 1945 wrote a well-known paper on Lars Onsager's principle of microscopic reversibility. He became a co-director of Philips NatLab in 1946 and a member of the board of directors of the company in 1956. He retired from Philips in 1972.

Although he spent much of his professional life in industry, Hendrik Casimir was one of the great Dutch theoretical physicists. Casimir made many contributions to science during his years in research from 1931 to 1950. These contributions include: pure mathematics, Lie groups (1931); hyperfine structure, calculation of nuclear quadrupole moments, (1935); low temperature physics, magnetism, thermodynamics of superconductors, paramagnetic relaxation (1935–1942); applications of Onsager's theory of irreversible phenomena (1942–1950).  He helped found the European Physical Society and became its president from 1972 till 1975. In 1979 he was one of the key speakers at CERN's 25th anniversary celebrations. In 1946 he became member of the Royal Netherlands Academy of Arts and Sciences.

While at Philips NatLab, in 1948 Casimir, collaborating with Dirk Polder,  predicted the quantum mechanical attraction between conducting plates now known as the Casimir effect, which has important consequences in Micro Electro-Mechanical Systems (MEMS), among others.

He was awarded six honorary doctor degrees by universities outside the Netherlands. He received numerous awards and prizes, among them the illustrious IRI Medal from the Industrial Research Institute in 1976. He was a Foreign Associate of the National Academy of Engineering. In 1982, he was awarded the Wilhelm Exner Medal. He was an elected member of the American Academy of Arts and Sciences, the United States National Academy of Sciences, and the American Philosophical Society.

Publications
 
 H. B. G. Casimir, Haphazard Reality: half a century of science (Harper & Row, New York, 1983); Casimir's autobiography in English. 
 H. B. G. Casimir, Het toeval van de werkelijkheid: Een halve eeuw natuurkunde (Meulenhof, Amsterdam, 1992); Casimir's autobiography in Dutch. 
 
 H. B. G. Casimir, On the attraction between two perfectly conducting plates, Proceedings of the Royal Netherlands Academy of Arts and Sciences, Vol. 51, pp. 793–795 (1948). 
 H. B. G. Casimir, and J. Ubbink, "The Skin Effect", "Philips Technical Review", Vol. 28, pp; 300–315 (1967)

Notes and references

Further reading

For some relevant bibliographical details the reader may consult: Hendrik Casimir/Sources.

Obituaries
 D. Polder, Hendrik Brugt Gerhard Casimir, 15 juli 1909 — 4 mei 2000, Levensberichten en herdenkingen 2001, Koninklijke Nederlandse Akademie van Wetenschappen, pp. 13–21 (in Dutch). 
 Steve K. Lamoreaux, Hendrik Brugt Gerhard Casimir, Biographical Memoirs, Proceedings of the American Philosophical Society, Vol. 146, No. 3, September 2002, pp. 285–290. (PDF)

External links

PhysicsWeb article on the Casimir Effect
The Casimir Force
 C. J. Gorter, C. J. Gorter's life & science, University of Leiden, Leiden, The Netherlands. 
 Oral History interview transcript with Hendrik Casimir on 5 July 1963, American Institute of Physics, Niels Bohr Library & Archives - Session I
 Oral History interview transcript with Hendrik Casimir on 6 July 1963, American Institute of Physics, Niels Bohr Library & Archives - Session II
 

1909 births
2000 deaths
20th-century Dutch physicists
Leiden University alumni
Academic staff of Leiden University
Members of the Royal Netherlands Academy of Arts and Sciences
Foreign associates of the National Academy of Sciences
Foreign associates of the National Academy of Engineering
Recipients of the Pour le Mérite (civil class)
Scientists from The Hague
Foreign Members of the Royal Society
Members of the German Academy of Sciences at Berlin
Recipients of the Matteucci Medal
Presidents of the European Physical Society
Members of the American Philosophical Society